Hieke Zijlstra (born 12 August 1981) is a Dutch footballer. She played as a midfielder or striker for clubs in the Netherlands, the United States and England, and has represented the Netherlands national team.

Club career
After starting her career in the Netherlands, Zijlstra moved to America in summer 2003. She played for the Chicago Cobras and Charlotte Lady Eagles, but rejected a scholarship in Florida to sign for English club Bristol Academy in August 2004.

Zijlstra returned to the Netherlands in 2006, where she continued to play.

International career
Zijlstra made her debut for the Netherlands in a 3-2 win in Belgium on 4 October 2000. She scored two goals in 10 appearances, the last of which came against Nigeria on 10 June 2003.

She also went to the 2001 Summer Universiade in Beijing, playing three matches, scoring one goal and winning a silver medal.

International goals
Scores and results list the Netherlands goal tally first.

Personal life
Zijlstra is a devout Christian.

External links
Profile
Interview

References

1981 births
Living people
Dutch women's footballers
Expatriate women's footballers in England
Netherlands women's international footballers
Bristol Academy W.F.C. players
People from Zuidhorn
Expatriate women's soccer players in the United States
Women's association football midfielders
Dutch expatriate women's footballers
Dutch expatriate sportspeople in England
Dutch expatriate sportspeople in the United States
Dutch Christians
Footballers from Groningen (province)
20th-century Dutch women
21st-century Dutch women
Charlotte Lady Eagles players
USL W-League (1995–2015) players
Chicago Cobras players